Hypena saltalis is a moth of the family Erebidae described by William Schaus and W. G. Clements in 1893. It is found in Sierra Leone.

See also
List of moths of Sierra Leone

References

saltalis
Moths of Africa
Moths described in 1893